Idaho Legislative District 28 is one of 35 districts of the Idaho Legislature. It is currently represented by Jim Guthrie, Republican  of McCammon, Representative Randy Armstrong, Republican of Inkom, and Representative Kelley Packer, Republican of McCammon.

District profile (2012–present) 
District 28 currently consists of all of Power and portion of Bannock County.

District profile (2002–2012) 
From 2002 to 2012, District 28 consisted of part of Bingham County.

District profile (1992–2002) 
From 1992 to 2002, District 28 consisted of all of Teton County and a portion of Bonneville and Fremont Counties.

See also

 List of Idaho Senators
 List of Idaho State Representatives

References

External links
Idaho Legislative District Map (with members)
Idaho Legislature (official site)

28
Power County, Idaho
Bannock County, Idaho